Okinawan kusarigama is a rare chain (鎖) and sickle (鎌) weapon found in the Okinawan kobudō weapons set. A noted modern practitioner of the weapon was Seike Toma, a student of Chōtoku Kyan and a teacher of Seikichi Odo.

Differing from kusarigama of Japanese Archipelago in anatomy and techniques, its use and design also varies depending on stylistic preferences or individual choices. The most common design, also known colloquially as "flying kamas", is where the chain (usually replaced with a rope) is attached to the bottom of the handle in the form of a loop. Another variation is where two kama are joint with a rope attached to the bottom of each. There also exists another, reminiscent of Japanese kusarigama but with a sickle smaller in size.

Sources 
Kusarigama: The Flashing Art of the Sickle Weapon, Tadashi Yamashita, 1986, Ohara Publications, Burbank, California 

Weapons of Okinawa
Blade weapons
Flail weapons